Selenicë is a municipality in Vlorë County, southwestern Albania. It was formed at the 2015 local government reform by the merger of the former municipalities Armen, Brataj, Kotë, Selenicë, Sevaster and Vllahinë, that became municipal units. The seat of the municipality is the town Selenicë.

The total population is 16,396 (2011 census), in a total area of 561.52 km2. The population of the former municipality at the 2011 census was 2,235. In the 2011 Albanian census, the former municipality of Selenica was the only commune where the number of self-declared Aromanians (16.6%) outnumbered the number of declared ethnic Albanians(10%), while most inhabitants didn't declare any ethnicity. Based on a 2014 Albanian government report, around 100 Greeks also live in Selenicë.

The town is well known for its bitumen mines. The football (soccer) club is KS Selenicë.

References 

 
Municipalities in Vlorë County
Administrative units of Selenicë
Aromanian settlements in Albania